Peperomia rupicola is a species of plant in the family Piperaceae. It is endemic to Ecuador.

References

Flora of Ecuador
rupicola
Vulnerable plants
Taxonomy articles created by Polbot